Ravindra Kumar Bhadana is an Indian politician and a member of the 16th Legislative Assembly of Uttar Pradesh of India. He represents the Meerut South constituency of Uttar Pradesh and is a member of the Bharatiya Janata Party political party.

Early life and  education
Ravindra Kumar  Bhadana was born in Meerut district, Uttar Pradesh. He attended Janta Inter College and is educated till twelfth grade.

Political career
Ravindra Kumar Bhadana has been a MLA for one term. He represented the Meerut South constituency and is a member of the Bharatiya Janata Party political party.

Posts held

See also

Meerut South
Sixteenth Legislative Assembly of Uttar Pradesh
Uttar Pradesh Legislative Assembly

References 

1963 births
Living people
People from Meerut district
Uttar Pradesh MLAs 2012–2017
Bharatiya Janata Party politicians from Uttar Pradesh